Breathing system may refer to:

 Respiratory system, the biological system in the bodies of animals
 Artificial respiration, several systems to breath artificially
 Cardio-pulmonary resuscitation, a technique/system to maintain breathing when autonomic breathing fails
 Ventilator
 Breathing circuit, a medical device, to breathe and introduce anesthesia
 Breathing set (disambiguation), equipment systems used to breath in hostile environments

See also
 Breathing